Lithophane disposita, the dashed gray pinion, is a species of cutworm or dart moth in the family Noctuidae. It is found in North America.

The MONA or Hodges number for Lithophane disposita is 9892.

References

Further reading

 
 
 

disposita
Articles created by Qbugbot
Moths described in 1874